Kim Il is the name of:
 Kim Il (wrestler) (born 1971), North Korean wrestler
 Kintaro Ohki, (1929-2006), professional wrestler
 Kim Il (pentathlete), South Korean pentathlete
 Kim Il (politician) (1910–1984), Premier of North Korea from 1972 to 1976

See also
 Kim Il-sung, previous leader of North Korea
 Kim Jong-il, previous leader of North Korea